Statistics of Division 2 in the 1934–35 season.

Overview
It was contested by 16 teams, and Metz won the championship.

League standings

References
France - List of final tables (RSSSF)

Ligue 2 seasons
France
2